The University of Arkansas at Monticello College of Forestry, Agriculture, and Natural Resources is located within the Henry H Chamberlin Forest Resource Complex on the UAM campus in Monticello, Arkansas. The Chamberlin Forest Resources Complex also houses the Arkansas Forest Resource Center. The School employs 17 faculty and offers three Bachelor of Science degrees, one Associate of Science degree, one Masters of Science degree, and five minors.

The UAM School of Forest Resources is the only forestry school in the State of Arkansas.

History
In 2015, the school's name was changed from the School of Forestry to the School of Forestry and Natural Resources.

In July 2018, the School of Agriculture merged with the School of Forestry and Natural Resources to become the College of Forestry, Agriculture, and Natural Resources.

Degrees 
The School offers Bachelor of Science Degrees in the following disciplines:

Forest Resources
Wildlife Management
Spatial Information Systems - The Spatial Information Systems degree has emphases in both Land surveying and geographic information systems.
Agribusiness
Animal Science
Plant and Soil Science
General Agriculture

Degree minors are available in Forest Resources, Wildlife Management, Land Surveying, Agriculture, and GIS.

The School offers Master of Science Degrees in the following disciplines:

Forest Resources

The School also offers an Associate of Science in Land Surveying Technology.

UADA/UAM Geospatial Science Lab 
The CFANR has a UADA/UAM Geospatial Science Lab. This lab is central to the unit’s research in the areas of Geographic Information Systems (GIS), Global Positioning Systems (GPS), Remote Sensing, and Expert Systems at UAM. The lab utilizes these geo-technologies to focus on developing applications and research to improve natural resource management. This is accomplished by integrating high-tech computer facilities with the expertise of the faculty and staff to evaluate complex problems and provide solutions for more effective natural resource management strategies.

The research and projects at UADA/UAM Geospatial Science Lab involve the development of applications for new technologies in the field of environmental information sciences, geo-intelligence (advanced geo-information science and earth observation, machine and deep learning, and big data analytics), remote sensing, sUAS/drones, land evaluation, pedology (i.e., soil genesis and classification), forest health monitoring, land use management/planning, monitoring and evaluating sustainable land management, change detection of landscape degradation, and geographic information system models. 

The UADA/UAM Geospatial Science Lab promotes the use of geo-technologies throughout the state and the nation. The lab work allows interdisciplinary cooperation, data-rich analytics research, and active outreach across a range of scientific fields (agriculture, forests, and climate change) with major societal impacts. We work closely with community and business leaders, policymakers, educators, students, and members of the general public to ensure the sustainability and proper use of the state's natural resources (i.e. soils, water, and biodiversity). 

Geospatial information and resources, engagement opportunities, and materials are provided through this website: https://uadauam-geospatial-science-lab-uamgis.opendata.arcgis.com/

References 

UAM SFNR Degree Programs
UADA/UAM Geospatial Science Lab

External links 
UAM School of Forestry and Natural Resources
UADA/UAM Geospatial Science Lab
UAM Spatial Analysis Lab
National Geodetic Survey
OPUS
Center for Advanced Spatial Technologies

Forestry and Natural Resources